The IEEE Sensors Journal is a biweekly peer-reviewed scientific journal, covering research on sensors. It is published by the IEEE Sensors Council. The editor-in-chief is Sandro Carrara. According to the Journal Citation Reports, the journal has a 2022 impact factor of 4.325, as well as an Eigenfactor at 0.03365, and an Article Influence Score at 0.612

Journal leadership

Best paper awards
The annual IEEE Sensors Journal Best Paper Award recognizes the best paper published in the journal. Winners are presented with a certificate and $2,000 split equally among the authors.

References

External links

Paper Template for Authors 
IEEE Sensors Journal Articles

Engineering journals
Sensors Journal
Biweekly journals
Publications established in 2001
English-language journals